Daniel Marcus is a science fiction author from Berkeley, California.  He has written numerous short stories that have appeared in Witness, Asimov's Science Fiction, Realms of Fantasy, The Magazine of Fantasy & Science Fiction, and other publications.   Binding Energy, a collection of his short stories, was published in 2008 to positive reviews.  He has authored two novels and is currently an instructor at Gotham Writers' Workshop.  Daniel Marcus is a graduate of Clarion West Writers Workshop and holds a Ph.D. in mechanical engineering from UC Berkeley.

References

External links
 Daniel Marcus Official Website

Living people
American science fiction writers
21st-century American novelists
Hampshire College alumni
Writers from Berkeley, California
UC Berkeley College of Engineering alumni
American male novelists
American male short story writers
21st-century American short story writers
21st-century American male writers
Year of birth missing (living people)